The Cork Admirals are an American Football team that play in the Irish American Football League (IAFL). The team is based in Presentation Brothers College Sports Ground, Cork.

The team was formed in 2001, playing along with 4 other teams that year.
The Admirals became one of the best teams in the IAFL, appearing in the playoffs semifinals numerous times.
The teams also held a reputation for a lot of records in the IAFL mostly in points in a game and rushing.

History 
The Admirals first game was in December 2002. In a rain soaked game the Admirals lost 28–18 to the Dublin Rebels in an 8-a-side challenge match. Despite the loss the performance held encouraging signs for the team, and increased enthusiasm in the club.
The team stepped up to 11-a-side for the next two friendly matches. Unfortunately both games resulted in defeat for the Admirals, going down 26–12 to the Dublin Rebels and 8–0 to the Dublin Dragons.
In the 2003 season, the club's first season of IAFL league play, the team managed only a 1–5 record. The first victory came in the spring of 2003, defeating the UL Vikings in an 8-a-side contest. The club would get its first 11-a-side victories against the same side that winter in two challenge games.
The following year saw the Cork Admirals improve to a 3–5 record in the expanded IAFL. Despite this the Dublin Dragons, with a similar 3–5 record beat the Admirals to the final playoff spot. The final game of that season was the Admirals best performance, beating the Dublin Dragons 68–20 at Pfizer Sports Grounds.
The Admirals held a recruitment drive in the Autumn of 2004, adding starting players and depth alike. Many of the current Admirals players were found in this recruitment drive. A victory against Limerick in a November challenge game introduced the rookies to Admirals football and prepared them for the season ahead.
The Admirals season got off to a poor start when the U.L. Vikings recorded their first ever win over the Cork side. This started a four-game losing spell for the Admirals, despite some encouraging performances and close losses, as injuries and low squad numbers took their toll. The Summer brought about improved play from the Admirals and the results followed. The Admirals won three of their final four contests of the season, including two home wins to clinch a playoff spot, and return the Admirals to playoff contender status.
The Belfast Bulls, league winners in 2005, proved too strong for the Admirals, however, ending the Admirals hopes for a Shamrock Bowl berth that season. 
In May 2013, the Admirals encountered players numbers problems and briefly halted playing operations. However, they have now made a return guided by a core nucleus of young players making the IAFL-1 Bowl final but losing out to UCD 40–0.  They returned to the IAFL-1 Bowl final in 2015 but unfortunately lost out on a nailbiter to Waterford Wolves 13–12.  Finally having won the IAFL-1 with an undefeated season in 2016, they re-entered the Shamrock Bowl Conference for 2017.

Shamrock Bowl XXI 
In 2007, the Admirals made their first Shamrock Bowl with a victory over the Dublin Rebels 8–6 in the semifinals. The team faced IAFL South division rivals, the UL Vikings. In a very tight contest, the Admirals were unable to beat the Vikings. The game finished 22–14. Good individual efforts by players gave the Admirals high hopes going into the 2008 IAFL season.

Shamrock Bowl XXXII 
In 2018 the Admirals returned to the Shamrock Bowl after an 11-year gap to their last appearance.  The (5-3) Admirals took on the (6-2) Dublin Rebels in Tallaght Stadium on 19 August.  The game ended in dramatic fashion after a back and forward 4th quarter.  Admirals took the lead in the 1st quarter when Stephen Hayes connected with Simon 'Kit' O'Keeffe for an 8-yard score at the back left of the end zone.  The XP was missed, however.  With just seconds left in the 1st half Hayes picked out Jahn Dasini on the right sideline in the end zone and he was able to drag his toes and haul in the score.  The trick play 2PAT was unsuccessful and Admirals went into the break leading 12–0.  The 3rd quarter was mostly a defensive stalemate but the game exploded into life in the final quarter.  Rebels scored first through Wello Omo and Simon Mackey added the 2PAT at the left pylon to leave it 12–8.  With 5 minutes left on the clock, Wello Omo broke off a huge run from well inside his own half to put the Rebels ahead.  The 2 PAT was unsuccessful to leave the score at 14–12 to the Rebels.  With just over 2 minutes left on the clock, the Rebels were backed up in their own red zone on 3rd and 30.  A quick punt was blocked down. The punter regathered and attempted to punt again but Dan Sheedy batted it down and it bounced into the end zone where he was able to pounce on the ball to score.  The XP was missed leaving the Admirals ahead 18–14.  The Rebel drove again but the Admirals were able to keep them at bay when the ball was picked off by CB Paul Farrell.   Starting in their own red zone they were unable to get anything going on offence and elected to punt.  Rather than attempt a difficult punt from their own end zone O'Keeffe elected to run out the back of the end zone to give the Rebels a safety and leave the score 18–16.  This meant the Admirals could kick uncontested from their own 20.  The Rebels went 4 and out after a negative kick return and the Admirals knelt out the game and were crowned Shamrock Bowl XXXII and National Champions.

Hall of Fame 
The Admirals created a Hall of Fame in 2016.  The first inductee was RB Keith O'Callaghan who is also currently a coach for the team.  In 2017 LB Trevor O'Connell was the second inductee to the Hall of Fame.

Alain Pezeron and Keith O'Callaghan runningback duo 
Historically the Admirals were known to have had one of the most punishing ground attacks in the IAFL. Pezeron and O'Callaghan have broken numerous records in the league.
Alain Pezeron has broken records for most points scored by a single player at 34 points and rushing touchdowns in a single game at 5.

Keith O'Callaghan has been named Offensive Player of the Year for the Admirals a record six years in a row. Keith O'Callaghan was inducted into the Admirals Hall of Fame in 2016.  He returned to play in 2017 after a 9-year absence and is currently also a coach.

External links 
 

American football teams in the Republic of Ireland
2002 establishments in Ireland
American football teams established in 2001